The Invaders is the second in a series of novels called Brotherband by Australian author John Flanagan. The book was released in Australia on 1 May 2012.

Synopsis 
Hal and his crew are chasing Zavac. However, due to a massive storm, they are forced to stop and resume the chase later. They take shelter at a bay Hal names Shelter Bay for a few weeks, where they repair their ship, add the Mangler, a giant crossbow, a hull fin for extra maneuverability, and train under Thorn. Afterward, they go to a small Skandian village to stock up on supplies while asking about Zavac's ship, the Raven. Meanwhile, Zavac and his crew take over a small trading vessel and search the strongbox, where they find emeralds. Zavac demands to know where they have come from. The leader of the trading fleet, after extensive torture, tells Zavac that the emeralds came from Limmat, a town further up the coast of Sonderland. Zavac goes to Limmat, tricks the soldiers garrisoned there, easily takes over the town, and forces the miners to work even harder to give Zavac emeralds. However, a girl named Lydia manages to escape using a small skiff.

While Hal is going back to Shelter Bay, he thinks he sees Wolfwind, the Oberjarl Erak's ship, and sails south for a day. While heading back they find Lydia, who tells them about the pirate attack. Hal thinks it may be Zavac so he continues back to Shelter Bay. Wolfwind, led by the Skandian Svengal, finds them but ends up helping them. The next day, they begin sailing to Limmat, and when they arrive, they see Zavac's ship. Thus, they hide in the marshes where they find the town's remaining soldiers, led by Barat, a man who thinks he owns Lydia, in hiding. Hal forms a plan with the locals to take back the town in 5 days. They are able to, after many mishaps, conquer the pirates, but Zavac slips away, burning two of his ships to prevent pursuit, and crippling Wolfwind, forcing the Heron to turn back and help Svengal and his crew bail water and dock in the bay.

While Barat gives a victory speech to the townspeople, claiming all the credit for himself and not the Skandians, and publicly proposing to Lydia and saying that she has already said yes, Thorn and Stefan free an imprisoned pirate to serve as their guide to follow Zavac, and leave on the Heron with Lydia, who is disgusted by Barat and caught in the middle of a love triangle between Hal, Stig, and herself.

External links 
 The Invaders at Random House Australia
 The Invaders at Random House New Zealand
 The Invaders at Penguin Group (USA)

Brotherband books
2012 Australian novels
Random House books
Philomel Books books